Barzilla Worth Clark (December 22, 1880 – September 21, 1943) was an American politician from Idaho. He served as the 16th governor of Idaho  mayor of Idaho Falls, and was a member of the Idaho Democratic Party.

Early life and education
Clark was born in Hadley, Indiana, the son of Eunice (Hadley) and Joseph Addison Clark. Clark made the journey to eastern Idaho by narrow-gauge railroad in 1885 with his family to Eagle Rock (now  He attended Rose Polytechnic Institute in Terre Haute, Indiana, but left school due to a lung injury during track and field practice.

Career 
After leaving school, Clark returned to Idaho and engaged in farming, mining, and cattle raising. On October 26, 1905, he married Ethel Salome Peck, and they had four children.

Clark became a licensed engineer in 1905 and worked as a civil engineer. His reservoir on the Blackfoot River was purchased by the government and his plan for impounding Lost River was merged into Mackay Dam. After two terms as councilman, he served as mayor of Idaho Falls from 1913 to 1915 and again from 1926 to 1936. During this term, the city built the Municipal Hydroelectric Plant No. 1.

Clark's interest turned to Idaho mines until he was again elected mayor of Idaho Falls in 1927 and served until his inauguration as governor on January 4, 1937. During his two-year term, a state tuberculosis hospital was authorized, a judicious pardon and parole system was installed, and junior college districts were created.

Clark lost the Democratic primary for a second term to his predecessor, C. Ben Ross, who ran for United States Senate in 1936 against longtime incumbent William Borah. Ross lost the general election in 1938 to C. A. Bottolfsen; Clark left office on January 2, 1939, and returned to Idaho Falls and his private interests. He chose not to run in 1940 to reclaim the office, which was won by his younger brother Chase Clark (1883–1966). Chase was the father-in-law of Frank Church (1924–84), a four-term U.S. Senator (1957–81) and presidential candidate in 1976. In turn, Bottolfsen defeated Chase in 1942.

Death
Clark died of complications of lung cancer at age 62 in Idaho Falls  he is interred at Rose Hill Cemetery in Idaho Falls.

References

External links
University of Idaho Library – Barzilla Clark (1885–1943), papers 1937–1938
National Governors Association
Gem of the Mountains, UI annual: 1938
South Fork Companion: Barzilla Clark

1880 births
1943 deaths
Mayors of places in Idaho
Democratic Party governors of Idaho
People from Idaho Falls, Idaho
People from Bonneville County, Idaho
People from Hendricks County, Indiana
American civil engineers
Deaths from lung cancer
Methodists from Idaho
Deaths from cancer in Idaho
20th-century American politicians